Mount Columbia is a historic home located near Manquin, King William County, Virginia.  It was built in two sections; the rear section was built about 1790 and the front was added about 1835.  It is a two-story, five bay, rectangular brick dwelling in the Federal style.  The front section has a single-pile, central hall plan.  Also on the property are the contributing brick kitchen dependency, a family cemetery and the vestiges of a formal garden.

It was listed on the National Register of Historic Places in 1989.

References

Houses on the National Register of Historic Places in Virginia
Federal architecture in Virginia
Houses completed in 1835
Houses in King William County, Virginia
National Register of Historic Places in King William County, Virginia